October Road may refer to:

October Road (album), 2002
October Road (TV series), 2007